The third series of the British version of The Masked Singer premiered on ITV on 1 January 2022, following a Christmas singalong episode which aired on 25 December 2021, and concluded on 12 February 2022. The series was won by singer Natalie Imbruglia as "Panda", with singer Charlotte Church finishing second as "Mushroom", and singer Mark Feehily placing third as "Robobunny".

Production
Prior to the airing of the second series' finale, panellist Jonathan Ross revealed that the programme would be returning for a third series. Filming for the series took place between 1 and 13 November 2021.

Panellists and host

Following the announcement of the series, it was confirmed by ITV that Joel Dommett would return to present the series, whilst Jonathan Ross, Davina McCall, Rita Ora and Mo Gilligan would all return to the panel.

Guest panellists included Olly Alexander in the sixth episode, Joan Collins in the seventh episode and series two winner Joss Stone in the eighth episode.

Contestants
A series of teasers revealing all twelve costumes were released on 27 November 2021.

Episodes

Episode 1 (1 January)

Episode 2 (2 January)

Episode 3 (8 January)
Theme: Movies
Group number: "Another Day of Sun" from La La Land

Episode 4 (15 January)
Theme: Love
Group number: "I Want It That Way" by Backstreet Boys

Episode 5 (22 January)

Episode 6 (29 January)

Episode 7: Semi-final (5 February)

Episode 8: Final (12 February)
Group number: "The Edge of Glory" by Lady Gaga

Ratings
Official ratings are taken from BARB, utilising the four-screen dashboard which includes viewers who watched the programme on laptops, smartphones, and tablets within 7 days of the original broadcast.

References

2022 British television seasons
The Masked Singer (British TV series)